Moyna may refer to:

 Moyna, Purba Medinipur, a village in West Bengal, India
 Moyna (community development block), containing the village
 Moyna (Vidhan Sabha constituency), containing the village and CD block
 Moyna College
 Moyna (album), a 1988 album by Ayub Bachchu
 Moyna Macgill (1895–1975), Irish-born British actress

See also
 Moina (disambiguation)
 Myna, a species of bird